

List of Ambassadors

Oded Joseph 2019 - 
Noah Gal Gendler 2017 - 2019
Yahel Vilan 2015 - 2017
Shalom Cohen 2014 - 2015
Gil Haskel 2011 - 2014
Jacob Keidar 2007 - 2011
Emanuel Seri 2003 - 2007
Yaacov Amitai 1999 - 2003
Menashe Zipori 1994 - 1999
Arye Oded 
Arie Ivtsan 1988 - 1991
Mordechai Yedid 1980 - 1982
Zeev Dover 1975 - 1977
Reuven Dafni 1969 - 1973
Arieh Eilan 1963 - 1966

References

Kenya
Israel